The 2016 Judo Grand Slam Paris was held in Paris, France, from 6 to 7 February 2016.

Medal summary

Men's events

Women's events

Source Results

Medal table

References

External links
 

2016 IJF World Tour
2016 Judo Grand Slam
Judo
Grand Slam Paris 2016
Judo
Judo